The European List of Notified Chemical Substances (ELINCS) provides an EINECS number. The system was used by the European Union to identify commercially available chemical substances. Since 1 June 2007 EU Members, Liechtenstein, Iceland and Norway apply the REACH protocol (Registration, Evaluation, Authorisation of Chemicals).

References

External links 
 EC Inventory

Chemical numbering schemes
European Union law
Regulation of chemicals in the European Union